The 1986–87 Rugby Football League season was the 92nd season of rugby league football. Sixteen clubs competed for the Championship which was determined by League position.

Season summary

The Silk Cut Challenge Cup Winners were Halifax who beat St. Helens 19-18 in the final.

The John Player Special Trophy Winners were Wigan who beat Warrington 18-4 in the final.

The Stones Bitter Premiership Trophy Winners were Wigan who beat Warrington 8-0 in the final.

Wigan beat Oldham 27–6 to win the Lancashire County Cup, and Castleford beat Hull F.C. 31–24 to win the Yorkshire County Cup.

Championship

Stones Bitter League Champions were Wigan for the tenth time in their history, losing only two league games all season - both to Warrington. Oldham, Featherstone Rovers, Barrow and Wakefield Trinity were relegated. A one-off 'two-up, four-down' promotion was used to reduce the top division to 14 clubs.

Second Division

A complicated fixture formula was introduced in the Second Division and continued until the 1991–92 season. 2nd Division Champions were Hunslet, and Swinton were also promoted.

Challenge Cup

Wigan’s 10-8 defeat to Oldham in Round One this season, would be their last Challenge Cup defeat until February 1996.

Halifax and St Helens reached the final with 'Fax coming out victorious with a 19-18 win at Wembley before a crowd of 91,267.
A desperate tackle by Halifax's John Pendlebury was seen as instrumental in giving his side the victory, which was their fifth in twelve Final appearances.

Halifax's Australian fullback, Graham Eadie, won the Lance Todd Trophy.

League Cup

Premiership

Kangaroo Tour

The months of October and November also saw the appearance of the Australian team in England on their 1986 Kangaroo Tour. Other than the three test Ashes series against Great Britain (won 3–0 by Australia), The Kangaroos played and won matches against 9 Championship teams (Wigan, Hull KR, Leeds, Halifax, St Helens, Oldham, Widnes, Hull, and Bradford Northern) and one county side (Cumbria).

The 1986 Kangaroos were coached by Don Furner who had toured as a player in 1956–57 while the team captain was Wally Lewis who had been the vice-captain of the 1982 Kangaroos.

Dual-rugby international Michael O'Connor of the St George Dragons was the leading point scorer on the tour with 170 from 13 tries and 59 goals. Canterbury-Bankstown stand-off / loose forward Terry Lamb was the leading try scorer with 19, including scoring 5 against Hull Kingston Rovers at Craven Park on 15 October. Lamb also became the first player to appear in every match of a Kangaroo Tour.

The 1986 Kangaroos became known as The Unbeatables after their second successive unbeaten Kangaroo Tour.

References

Sources
1986-87 Rugby Football League season at wigan.rlfans.com

1986 in English rugby league
1987 in English rugby league
Rugby Football League seasons